The 1966 United States Senate election in Kansas took place on November 8, 1966, concurrently with elections to the United States Senate in other states as well as elections to the United States House of Representatives and various state and local elections.

Incumbent Republican U.S. Senator James B. Pearson defeated Democratic nominee James Floyd Breeding with 52.15% of the vote.

Primary elections 
Primary elections were held on August 2, 1966.

Democratic primary

Candidates 
James Floyd Breeding, former U.S. Representative for Kansas's 5th congressional district
Harold S. Herd, incumbent State Senator
K. L. "Ken" Smith, Democratic nominee for U.S. Senate in 1962
J. Leigh Warner, insurance executive

Results

Republican primary

Candidates 
Ava V. Anderson
Robert F. Ellsworth, incumbent U.S. Representative for Kansas's 3rd congressional district
James B. Pearson, incumbent U.S. Senator
William D. Tarrant, former mayor of Wichita

Results

General election

Candidates 
James B. Pearson (R)
James Floyd Breeding (D)
George W. Snell (C)
Earl F. Dodgel (P), Prohibition nominee for Indiana's 2nd congressional district in 1960

Results

See also 
 1966 United States Senate elections

References

Bibliography
 
 

1966
Kansas
United States Senate